Aki Yanagisawa is a Japanese soprano.

A graduate of the Tokyo National University of Fine Arts and Music, she finished third in the fifth annual Japanese Vocal Music Competition in 1993. She is a member of the Bach Collegium Japan, and performed in their recordings of the complete Bach cantatas, more frequently as a member of the chorus than a soloist. For example, she sings in the choir in the first volume recorded in June/July 1995; in the second volume recorded later the same year she sings as a soloist in Gottes Zeit ist die allerbeste Zeit, BWV 106.

She has performed as a soloist in George Frideric Handel’s Messiah, Beethoven’s Symphony No. 9 and on the opera stage as Suzanna in Mozart’s The Marriage of Figaro.

References

Japanese sopranos
21st-century Japanese women opera singers
Living people
Bach singers
Year of birth missing (living people)
Place of birth missing (living people)
Tokyo University of the Arts alumni
20th-century Japanese women opera singers